The 2016 FIM Moto2 World Championship was a part of the 68th F.I.M. Road Racing World Championship season. The season was marred by the death of Luis Salom during a free practice session, at the Catalan Grand Prix.

Johann Zarco started the season as the defending World Champion, having secured his first championship title at the 2015 Japanese Grand Prix. With victory at the Malaysian Grand Prix – his sixth of the 2016 season – Zarco was able to retain his title, amassing an unassailable points lead ahead of the final round in Valencia. Zarco completed the season with victory in Valencia, as he won the championship by an eventual margin of 42 points.

The runner-up position remained up for grabs in Valencia, as four-time winner Thomas Lüthi, double winner Álex Rins and Franco Morbidelli all had a mathematical chance of finishing there. Ultimately with a second-place finish, Lüthi finished clear of Rins by 20 points; Lüthi's last-lap pass on Morbidelli also cost the latter third place in the championship by a point, as Rins had finished the race in fifth place. Morbidelli took a total of eight podium finishes, including each of the last five races, but was unable to take a victory. Four other riders won races; Sam Lowes took two race victories at Jerez and Aragon, Jonas Folger won at Brno, while first Grand Prix victories went to Takaaki Nakagami at Assen, and Lorenzo Baldassarri in Misano. The constructors' championship went to Kalex with a maximum score of 450 points, with a 34-race winning streak at the conclusion of the season – a run stretching back to a Speed Up victory for Lowes at the 2015 Motorcycle Grand Prix of the Americas.

Changes for 2016
French oil and gas giants company Total was selected to become official fuel supplier of Moto2 and Moto3 beginning from 2016 onwards, replacing Eni after five seasons as a fuel supplier of Moto2 and Moto3.

Calendar
The following Grands Prix took place in 2016.

 ‡ = Night race

Calendar changes
 The Grand Prix of the Americas and the Argentine Grand Prix have swapped places, with Argentina hosting the second round, while the Grand Prix of the Americas hosts the third round.
 For the first time in the history of the Dutch TT, the races were held on a Sunday.
 The 2016 season had seen the return of the Austrian Grand Prix to the series' schedule after 19 years of  absence. The last race, which had been the 1997 Austrian Grand Prix, was held at the A1 Ring, now called the Red Bull Ring.
 Having been on the calendar since 2008, the Indianapolis Grand Prix was taken off the calendar.

Teams and riders
A provisional entry list was announced on 7 November 2015. All Moto2 competitors raced with an identical CBR600RR inline-four engine developed by Honda. Teams competed with tyres supplied by Dunlop.

Team changes
 JiR Moto2 announced that they would withdraw from the championship at the end of the 2015 season.
 Dynavolt Intact GP expanded to enter a second bike, while Italtrans Racing downgraded to a single entry in 2016.
 Leopard Racing returned to the Moto2 class after previously competing as Kiefer Racing from 2010 to 2012. The team competed on Kalex bikes, with Danny Kent and Miguel Oliveira as their riders.
 AGP Racing, who were listed on the provisional entry list, withdrew from the championship due to financial problems, leaving Federico Fuligni and Remy Gardner without rides.
 IodaRacing Project SRL also withdrew from the championship.

Rider changes
 Luis Salom left Paginas Amarillas HP 40 at the end of the 2015 season to join Stop and Go Racing Team.
 Salom's place at Pons Racing was taken by 2015 FIM CEV Moto2 European Championship winner Edgar Pons.
 Moto3 World Champion Danny Kent returned to the Moto2 class with Leopard Racing, following a season with Tech 3 back in 2013.
 Franco Morbidelli moved to Estrella Galicia 0,0 Marc VDS, following Tito Rabat's decision to join MotoGP with Marc VDS for 2016.
 Simone Corsi left Forward Racing at the end of the 2015 season to join Speed Up Racing.
 Jonas Folger left the AGR Team to join Dynavolt Intact GP.
 Sam Lowes replaced Xavier Siméon at Federal Oil Gresini Moto2 as part of a contract-signing for a MotoGP seat with Gresini in 2017. Siméon joined the QMMF Racing Team as a result.
 Mika Kallio returned to MotoGP, after being left without a ride in Moto2. He joined KTM as a test rider for their 2017 MotoGP project.
 Miguel Oliveira moved up to the Moto2 class, joining Leopard Racing.
 Randy Krummenacher left Moto2 to join the Supersport World Championship following JiR's withdrawal from the championship.
 After competing in the second half of the 2015 season with Tech 3 as a replacement rider, Xavi Vierge moved up full-time to Moto2 with Tech 3.
 Efrén Vázquez moved up to the Moto2 class with JPMoto Malaysia replacing Ricard Cardús. Vázquez previously competed in the intermediate class in 2007.
 Luca Marini stepped up to the Moto2 class, with the Forward Team.
 Isaac Viñales moved up to the Moto2 class with Tech 3, replacing Marcel Schrötter. Schrötter moved to the AGR Team.
 Alessandro Tonucci moved up to the Moto2 class with Tasca Racing Scuderia Moto2 replacing Louis Rossi.
 Ratthapark Wilairot made a full-time return to Moto2 with IDEMITSU Honda Team Asia.
 Azlan Shah, who was on the provisional entry list with JPMoto Malaysia, withdrew due to financial problems.

In-season changes
 After the Grand Prix of the Americas, Efrén Vázquez left the JPMoto Malaysia team. He was replaced by Danny Eslick in the 5th race and by Ricard Cardús in the 6th race. Before the 7th race, the JPMoto Malaysia team went bankrupt, so the team retired from the rest of the season.
 After the Italian Grand Prix, Alessandro Tonucci left the Tasca Racing Scuderia team. He was replaced by Remy Gardner for the rest of the season starting with the 7th race.
 Luis Salom was killed after an accident during Friday practice at the Catalan Grand Prix. His teammate Jesko Raffin withdrew from the weekend. Before the Dutch TT, the SAG Racing Team announced that they will complete the season with Raffin as the team's sole rider, with Salom's spot on the team left vacated for the rest of the season.
 Dominique Aegerter got injured after the Czech Republic Grand Prix, so he was replaced by Iker Lecuona for the 12th and the 13th races. Aegerter returned for the 14th race. However, upon signing a 2017 contract with Leopard Racing, he was fired from Interwetten, bringing Lecuona back for the remaining 4 races.

Results and standings

Grands Prix

Riders' standings
Scoring system
Points were awarded to the top fifteen finishers. A rider had to finish the race to earn points.

Constructors' standings
Points were awarded to the top fifteen finishers. A rider had to finish the race to earn points.

 Each constructor got the same number of points as their best placed rider in each race.

References

External links
 The official website of Grand Prix motorcycle racing

Moto2
Grand Prix motorcycle racing seasons